The Morice Range is a subrange of the Tahtsa Ranges, located on the west side of Morice Lake in northern British Columbia, Canada.

References

Morice Range in the Canadian Mountain Encyclopedia

Hazelton Mountains